World War Zero is an American coalition launched by John Kerry in 2019 to fight the climate crisis. The main goal of the coalition is to hold more than ten million “climate conversations” in 2020 with citizens across the political spectrum.

Background 
According to scientists assembled by the United Nations, global carbon emissions must be halved by 2030 and eliminated entirely by 2050 in order to restrict global warming to comparatively safe levels for humanity.

John Kerry, former US presidential candidate and former US Secretary of State, launched the coalition in late 2019. Members of the organization include politicians, military leaders, and celebrities.

Goals
The aim of the coalition is to address climate change and find ways to prevent the destruction of human habitats. It plans to achieve this by mobilizing the public in America and around the world in order to raise awareness for the issue. Kerry stated that a rapid mobilization is needed to halt the increase in carbon emissions worldwide immediately.

The name of the coalition–World War Zero–refers to the danger to national security presented by global warming. When Chuck Todd asked John Kerry during his Sunday morning appearance on NBC’s Meet The Press, whether the real issue was getting United States President Donald Trump to act on climate, Kerry replied:

List of participants 
Among the 60 founders of the coalition were:
 Madeleine Albright, former US secretary of State
 Gordon Brown, former prime minister of the United Kingdom 
 Jimmy Carter, former US president
 Bill Clinton, former US president
 Leonardo DiCaprio, actor and environmental activist
 Katie Eder, activist and social entrepreneur
 John Kasich, former governor of Ohio
 John Kerry, former US senator and former US secretary of State
 Ashton Kutcher, actor and producer
 Cindy McCain,  businesswoman, philanthropist, and humanitarian
 Stanley A. McChrystal, retired United States Army general
 Shay Mitchell, actress, model, entrepreneur and author
 Ernest Moniz, nuclear physicist and former US secretary of Energy
 Hank Paulson, former US secretary of the Treasury
 Susan Rice, former US National Security Advisor and US Ambassador to the United Nations
 Arnold Schwarzenegger, former governor of California
 Al Sharpton, civil rights activist, Baptist minister, talk show host and politician
 Jaden Smith, rapper, singer, songwriter
 Olympia Snowe, businesswoman and politician, former United States Senator from Maine 
 Sting, singer
 Emma Watson, actress, model and activist
 Meg Whitman, business executive, political activist, and philanthropist

References

External links 
 World War Zero, official website

Climate change organizations based in the United States
Organizations established in 2019